Glenlola Collegiate School is an all-girls' grammar school in Bangor, County Down, Northern Ireland. The school was founded as a school for girls in approximately 1880.

In 2018 the Education and Training Electorate evaluated the school as "Good" in all categories.

The current principal, Mr W E Thompson, took up post in February 2010, taking over from Richard Finlay.

Notable former pupils

Inez McCormack, human rights activist and trade union leader
Zöe Salmon, Blue Peter presenter
Kelly Gallagher, Paralympic Gold medalist
Amy Foster (athlete), Commonwealth Games Athlete

References

External links

Grammar schools in County Down
Bangor, County Down
Girls' schools in Northern Ireland